Pygoleptura is a genus of beetles in the family Cerambycidae, containing the following species:

 Pygoleptura brevicornis (LeConte, 1873)
 Pygoleptura carbonata (LeConte, 1861)
 Pygoleptura nigrella (Say, 1826)

References

Lepturinae